Fort Armstrong (1816–1836), was one of a chain of western frontier defenses which the United States erected after the War of 1812. It was located at the foot of Rock Island, in the Mississippi River near the present-day Quad Cities of Illinois and Iowa.  It was five miles from the principal Sac and Fox village on Rock River in Illinois.  Of stone and timber construction, 300 feet square, the fort was begun in May 1816 and completed the following year. In 1832, the U.S. Army used the fort as a military headquarters during the Black Hawk War.  It was normally garrisoned by two companies of United States Army regulars.  With the pacification of the Indian threat in Illinois, the U.S. Government ceased operations at Fort Armstrong and the U.S. Army abandoned the frontier fort in 1836.

Rock Island Arsenal Island before construction of U.S. Army fort
In 1805, when President Thomas Jefferson sent Lewis and Clark on their expedition into the Louisiana Territory, he also sent Lieutenant Zebulon Pike and Major Stephan H. Long up the Mississippi River to gather data and determine strategic sites for forts. Pike identified one site as the "big island;" Congress agreed with his recommendation, reserving the island for military use in 1809 and naming it Rock Island. 

The Sauk considered the island sacred:

Construction

This was to be the second US fort between St. Louis and Prairie du Chien, Wisconsin. The US wanted to establish a military presence to dissuade the French and English Canadians (who traded in areas nearby) from encroaching upon the unorganized territory.  After its losses at several forts during the War of 1812, the US Army wanted to increase its presence on the Mississippi frontier. The fort also would serve to protect American settlers within the area and to help control or remove the Sauk, the American Indians in the region. The Sauk disapproved of its construction; Black Hawk wrote in his memoir, "When we arrived we found that the troops had come to build a fort on Rock Island. This, in our opinion, was a contradiction to what we had done– 'to prepare for war in time of peace.' We did not object, however, to their building their fort on the island, but were very sorry."

On May 10, 1816, soldiers arrived to begin construction of Fort Armstrong.  It was named after John Armstrong, the Secretary of War under President James Madison. The army assigned 600 soldiers and 150 laborers to the project. After the construction was completed, fewer than 200 soldiers garrisoned the post. Between 1824 and 1836, the garrison was reduced to fewer than 100 troops.

Black Hawk War cholera epidemic
During the Black Hawk War of 1832, General Winfield Scott led 1000 troops, to Fort Armstrong, to assist the U.S. Army garrison and militia volunteers stationed there. While General Scott's army was en route, along the Great Lakes, his troops had contracted Asiatic cholera, before they left the state of New York; it killed most of his 1000 soldiers. Only 220 U.S. Army regulars, from the original force, made the final march, from Fort Dearborn, in Chicago to Rock Island, Illinois. Winfield Scott and his troops likely carried the highly contagious disease with them; soon after their arrival at Rock Island, a local cholera epidemic broke out among both whites and Indians around the area of Fort Armstrong. Cholera microbes were spread through sewery-type contaminated water, which mixed with clean drinking water, brought on by poor sanitation practices of the day. Within eight days, 189 people died and were buried on the island.

Black Hawk War treaty negotiations

On September 21, 1832, the Black Hawk War officially came to an end with the treaty signed at Fort Armstrong. The defeated Sauk and Fox Indians agreed to cede to the US the lands they occupied east of the Mississippi River. Black Hawk, two of his sons, and other Sac and Fox warriors had been taken to the fort as prisoners after their captures following the Battle of Bad Axe. They spent the winter held at Jefferson Barracks in St. Louis, after which the Army took the men on a tour of Eastern cities, hoping to impress them with the wealth and power of white civilization. The natives met with President Andrew Jackson and were of great interest and celebrity among the white population, who at that period admiringly viewed natives as "noble savages." After a brief period of imprisonment at Fortress Monroe at Hampton Roads, Virginia, the Sauk and Fox warriors were allowed to return to Iowa.  Together with their people, they occupied a small reservation in Iowa allotted by the Treaty of Fort Armstrong. Black Hawk died there in 1838.

See also
Rock Island Arsenal

References

 D. W. Flagler, History of the Rock Island Arsenal
Stephen H. Long, Voyage in a Six-Oared Skiff to the Falls of Saint Anthony in 1817, Minnesota Historical Society Collections, II, Part I.

External links
Rock Island Arsenal Historical Tour
Armstrong
Rock Island, Illinois
Armstrong
Pre-statehood history of Wisconsin
Pre-statehood history of Illinois
1816 establishments in Illinois Territory